Adobe Illustrator Artwork (AI) is a proprietary file format developed by Adobe Systems for representing single-page vector-based drawings in either the EPS or PDF formats.  The .ai filename extension is used by Adobe Illustrator.

The AI file format was originally a native format called PGF. PDF compatibility is achieved by embedding a complete copy of the PGF data within the saved PDF format file. This format is not related to .pgf using the same name Progressive Graphics Format.

The same "dual path" approach as for PGF is used when saving EPS-compatible files in recent versions of Illustrator. Early versions of the AI file format are true EPS files with a restricted, compact syntax, with additional semantics represented by Illustrator-specific DSC comments that conform to DSC's Open Structuring Conventions. These files are identical to their corresponding Illustrator EPS counterparts, but with the EPS  (procedure sets) omitted from the file and instead externally referenced using %%Include directives.

Application support

Editors 
Aside from Adobe Illustrator, the following applications can edit .ai files:

Adobe After Effects can open and use .ai files for video editing.
Affinity Designer can open .ai files with PDF stream.
Cinema 4D can import .ai files for conversion to 3D images or for basic editing.
CorelDRAW (proprietary program) can natively edit this file format with some limitations.
Corel Paint Shop Pro (proprietary program) can natively edit this file format.
DrawPlus (proprietary program) can import v9 and above versions of this file format (must be saved as being PDF compatible).
FlexiSign (Vector Program used in Signmaking) Can read AI files.
FreeHand (proprietary program) can natively open and edit .ai file format version 8 or lower. FreeHand will export to .ai version 7 format.
Ghostscript (GPL-licensed program) can convert AI postscript files into various formats, and also allows programs that use Ghostscript such as GIMP to import AI files.
Inkscape (a free, GPL-licensed program) can import the old PostScript-based Adobe Illustrator format (up to AI ver.8) and AI files based on PDF (AI 9.0 and above).
OmniGraffle (proprietary program) a diagramming and digital illustration application from The Omni Group.
Scribus (a free, GPL-licensed Desktop publishing program) can open, edit and embed both PostScript- and PDF-based AI files.
Skencil (GPL-licensed program) also claims to have some AI support.
sK1 (a free, GPL-licensed vector graphics editor) supports PostScript-based AI files up to AI ver. 9.
UniConvertor (a free, GPL-licensed vector graphics translator) supports PostScript-based AI files up to AI ver. 9.
Xara Xtreme  (proprietary program) has support for the format that is described as "working". Xara Xtreme for Linux has similar support.
XnView uses Ghostscript to handle AI, EPS, PS, and PDF; this might work for AI files saved with the PDF compatibility option.
Zamzar  (a free online web-based tool) can convert AI files into a variety of image formats, including BMP, GIF, JPG and PNG.

Viewers 
 Adobe Reader can open .ai files for viewing if they are saved with the PDF compatibility option.
 Adobe Photoshop can open .ai files if they are saved with the PDF compatibility option.
 Preview can view .ai files if they are saved with the PDF compatibility option.
 Irfanview can open .ai files for viewing.
 Foxit Reader can open .ai files for viewing.
 Evince
 Imageglass can open .ai files for viewing if Ghostscript is installed.

See also 

 SVG format

References

External links
Adobe Illustrator File Format Specification—the official specification for the original EPS-based formats

Illustrator Artwork
Vector graphics file formats